

The 405-line transmitter network of the United Kingdom
Alexandra Palace in London hosted the first 405-line transmitter, active between 1936 and 1939, then again from 1946 through to 1956. From 1949 onwards the Band I VHF 405-line BBC transmitter network grew quickly.

In 1955 with the advent of ITV a parallel effort to provide a Band III network was also underway. The pre-1955 BBC stations used the five channels of Band I, but with the introduction of Band III some BBC stations started appearing there too (most of them on channels 12 or 13). All ITV transmitters were in Band III.

There were eventually 41 high power "main stations" owned by either the BBC or the IBA (see below). Most were built during the 1950s. The BBC's last main station to enter service was Belmont in Lincolnshire in November 1966, the IBA's last main station was the Welsh service from St. Hilary which went on-air in February 1965.

The main stations were supported by a large number of off-air relay stations to fill awkward gaps in the service from the main stations. The last of these (Llanelli in south Wales (BBC) and Newhaven in southeast England (IBA) had been built by late 1970.

The entire system was decommissioned between 1982 and January 1985.

Transmitters by region

England

Channel Islands

East

London and South East

Midlands

North

Northeast

Northwest

South

Southwest

West

Northern Ireland

Scotland

Wales

External links
MB21's page on BBC 405 TV
MB21's page on ITV 405 TV
405 Alive's list of transmitters"
More details on 405-line BBC transmitters

History of television in the United Kingdom